The Guy Carbonneau Trophy (Trophée Guy Carbonneau) is awarded annually to the player in the QMJHL judged to be the best defensive forward. The winner is determined by the number of face-offs won, plus-minus differential, the player's role within the team, and the number of scoring opportunities. The award is named after Guy Carbonneau, who won three Selke Trophies (1988, 1989, 1992) for best defensive forward in his distinguished National Hockey League career. He played for the Chicoutimi Saguenéens as a junior.

Winners

External links
 QMJHL official site List of trophy winners.

Quebec Major Junior Hockey League trophies and awards